The Fugs First Album is the 1965 debut album by American rock band the Fugs, described in their AllMusic profile as "arguably the first underground rock group of all time". In 1965, the album charted #142 on Billboard's "Top Pop Albums" chart. The album was originally released in 1965 as The Village Fugs Sing Ballads of Contemporary Protest, Point of Views, and General Dissatisfaction on Folkways Records before the band signed up with ESP-Disk, who released the album under its own label with a new name in 1966. The album was re-released in 1993 on CD with an additional 11 tracks.

History 
When poet and publisher Ed Sanders established a bookstore next to the apartment of beat poet and publisher Tuli Kupferberg in 1963, the two decided to form a band, the Fugs, writing 50-60 songs between them prior to asking Ken Weaver to join. The trio invited Steve Weber and Peter Stampfel of the band Holy Modal Rounders to perform with them at the February 1965 grand opening of Sanders' bookstore. Sanders describes the event as heavily attended, with William S. Burroughs, George Plimpton and James Michener among the luminaries in attendance. Harry Everett Smith, producer of the famous Anthology of American Folk Music, persuaded Folkways Records to issue the Fugs' first album. Following recording sessions in April and September 1965, the album The Village Fugs—Ballads and Songs of Contemporary Protest, Points of View and General Dissatisfaction was released in late 1965 (Broadside BR 304; also listed with a related Folkways serial number, FW 05304, though it is unclear whether this is a separate pressing/edition). Following a nationwide tour, the Fugs signed a contract with ESP-Disk, who re-released the album in 1966 (ESP-1018), in both mono and stereo, with some changed edits and one substituted take (see below).

A large number of additional performances were captured in the sessions for this album.  Eleven of them first appeared on a 1967 ESP album entitled "Virgin Fugs" (ESP-1038), and an additional 7 performances (five led by the Holy Modal Rounders) first appeared on the mid-1970s compilation "Fugs 4, Rounders Score" (ESP-2018)  The Fugs claim that both of these albums were unauthorized bootlegs.  Three additional performances and some studio chatter appear on the Fugs' 4-CD box set "Don't Stop! Don't Stop!"

The currently available CD contains the later ESP stereo version of the album.  It also includes, among its 11 bonus tracks, 6 outtakes from the sessions, including 5 from the above two ESP bootlegs.  The other 11 tracks, the alternate performance of "Swineburne Stomp" from the Broadside album, and the other Broadside edit variations, remain unreleased in the CD era.

The recent Fugs box set "Don't Stop! Don't Stop!" contains an additional three performances from these recording sessions.

Track listing 
The album has been released under multiple names and versions. The first was released in 1965 with a purple cover, credited as "The Village Fugs." The second version was released in 1966 on the ESP-Disk label with a blue-tinted cover, retitled "The Fugs First Album," and containing the exact recordings featured on the original Broadside edition; this is particularly noticeable because the song "Boobs A Lot" contains a mastering error in which the beginning of the song has been clipped off, an error that is included on both the original 1965 Broadside LP and the 1966 ESP blue-tinted LP. The third LP version, also called "The Fugs First Album," features a black-and-white cover and a few recordings which are different takes than on the earlier two editions, including a corrected full-version of "Boobs A Lot"; this third version of the LP is the most common. Note that the lack of an apostrophe seems to indicate that the title is not intended to be read as "The Fugs' First Album" (plural possessive) but rather as "The Fugs" (band name), then "First Album" (album title), as if there were an implied colon, as in "The Fugs: First Album". The album was first released on CD in 1994, with a new title.
Sing Ballads of Contemporary Protest, Point of Views, and General Dissatisfaction (1965 Broadside Records version)

The Fugs First Album (1966 ESP Disk version)
Same as 1965 version, but the song "My Baby Done Left Me" was renamed "I Feel Like Homemade Shit".

The Fugs First Album with Sizzling Additional Tracks from The Early Fugs (1994 CD version)

Variations 
The original (mono) Broadside release contains different edits of some of the songs from the now standard stereo ESP release.

The first three songs have longer introductions (usually a few seconds or bars of music).
"Supergirl," while the same basic performance, has the line "Fuck like an angel" changed to "mmmm like an angel"  (both versions render the last line as "shake like an mmmm in an mmmm").
"Swinburne Stomp" is an entirely different performance, introduced with Sanders' line "In the key of metaphysical distress."
"My Baby Done Left Me" edits out the final, very loud "shit", crudely replacing it with yodeling and a fade over a prior chorus.  It does, however, leave in the earlier line "I'd give up heifer fucking."
The performance of "Boobs a Lot" starts later in the song, on the line "Down in the locker room."
The sound quality of the first session material is extremely muffled.

At least one pressing on the ESP label includes these same takes and edits.  It is unclear when the substitutions were made.

ESP releases included at least three cover variations:  a blue tinted cover, a black and white cover with advertisements on the back, and a later psychedelic painting of a wizard.

Sessions 
This album was recorded entirely in two sessions.  The first took place in April 1965 and was a chaotic 3-hour acoustic jam featuring Sanders, Kupferberg, Weaver, Stampfel and Weber, performing (by Sanders' estimate) 23 songs.  The second recording session took place on September 22, 1965, according to Ed Sanders' memoir Fug You (page 161); this second session seems to have featured nine songs, recorded in stereo, including a drum set and electric instruments, with the core band members Sanders, Weaver and Kupferberg joined by musicians John Anderson (on bass), Steve Weber (on guitar) and Vinny Leary (on guitar).  By this point Peter Stampfel was no longer in the band.

Songs recorded at the April 1965 session 
Originally released on The Village Fugs (Broadside album):
"Swinburne Stomp" (version 1) (Ed Sanders, A.C. Swinburne)
"My Baby Done Left Me" (Sanders)
"Nothing" (Tuli Kupferberg) (additional intro appears on "Don't Stop! Don't Stop!")
Originally released on Virgin Fugs:
"We're the Fugs" (Sanders)
"New Amphetamine Shriek" (Peter Stampfel)
"Saran Wrap" (Sanders)
"The Ten Commandments" (Kupferberg)
"Hallucination Horrors" (Kupferberg)
"CIA Man" (Kupferberg)
"Coca Cola Douche" (Sanders? listed as Kupferberg)
"My Bed Is Getting Crowded"  (Kupferberg)
"Caca Rocka" (Kupferberg)
Originally released on Fugs 4, Rounders Score:
"Defeated" (Kupferberg)
"Jackoff Blues" (Kupferberg)
"Romping Through the Swamp" (Peter Stampfel)
"Crowley Waltz" (Traditional)
"Fiddler a Dram" (Traditional)
"Fishing Blues" (Traditional)
"New Amphetamine Shriek" [different performance from #5] (Peter Stampfel)
Originally released on The Fugs First Album (ESP variation of Broadside album):
"Swinburne Stomp" (version 2) [different performance from #1] (Sanders, A.C. Swinburne)
Originally released on Don't Stop! Don't Stop!:
 I'm Gonna Kill Myself Over Your Dead Body (Kupferberg)
"Ah, Sunflower, Weary of Time" (William Blake, Sanders) (Early version)
"Supergirl" (Kupferberg)  (Early "Write Underwater" version)
Originally released on "The Fugs First Album" CD:
"In the Middle of Their First Recording Session the Fugs Sign the Worst Record Contract Since Leadbelly's" (Petito, Sanders) [this is studio chatter plus 1990s electronic effects]
Tracks 15 though 18 feature only Stampfel and Weber.

Songs recorded at the September 22, 1965, session 
Originally released on The Village Fugs:
"Slum Goddess" (Ken Weaver)
"Ah, Sunflower, Weary of Time" (William Blake, Sanders)
"Supergirl" (Kupferberg)
"I Couldn't Get High" (Weaver)
"How Sweet I Roamed" (Blake, Sanders)
"Carpe Diem" (Kupferberg)
"Boobs a Lot" (Steve Weber)
Originally released on Virgin Fugs:
"I Command the House of the Devil" (Sanders)
"I Saw the Best Minds of My Generation Rot" (Allen Ginsberg, Sanders)

Personnel

Performance 
Ed Sanders – vocals
Tuli Kupferberg – percussion, vocals
Ken Weaver – conga, drums, vocals
Steve Weber – guitar, vocals
Peter Stampfel – fiddle, harmonica, vocals
John Anderson – bass guitar, vocals
Vinny Leary  – bass, guitar, vocals

Production 
Phil DeLancie – remastering
David Gahr – photography
Aaron Hurwitz – compilation, restoration
Linda Kalin – package adaptation
Ed Sanders – producer, liner notes, photography, memorabilia
Harry Smith – producer

References

Additional sources 
The Fugs Store: The Fugs First Album

1964 debut albums
Albums produced by Ed Sanders
Albums produced by Harry Everett Smith
ESP-Disk albums
Folkways Records albums
The Fugs albums